Memorial Coliseum (or Veterans Memorial Coliseum in some cases) may refer to:

 Alexander Memorial Coliseum, Atlanta
 Allen County War Memorial Coliseum, Fort Wayne, Indiana
 Arizona Veterans Memorial Coliseum, Phoenix, Arizona
 XL Center Veterans Memorial Coliseum, Hartford, Connecticut
 Jacksonville Veterans Memorial Coliseum, Jacksonville, Florida
 Los Angeles Memorial Coliseum, Los Angeles, California
 Lawrence Joel Veterans Memorial Coliseum, Winston-Salem, North Carolina
 Memorial Coliseum (Corpus Christi), Corpus Christi, Texas
 Memorial Coliseum (University of Kentucky), Lexington, Kentucky
 Nassau Veterans Memorial Coliseum, Uniondale, New York
 New Haven Veterans Memorial Coliseum, New Haven, Connecticut
 Winston-Salem Memorial Coliseum, Winston-Salem, North Carolina
 Veterans Memorial Coliseum (Marion, Ohio)
 Veterans Memorial Coliseum (Portland, Oregon)
 Veterans Memorial Coliseum (Madison, Wisconsin)

Memorial Coliseum is the former name of:

 Beard–Eaves–Memorial Coliseum, Auburn, Alabama
 Coleman Coliseum, Tuscaloosa, Alabama

See also 

 Memorial Field (disambiguation)
 Memorial Gymnasium (disambiguation)
 Memorial Stadium (disambiguation)